is a train station on the Minobu Line of Central Japan Railway Company (JR Central) located in the town of Ichikawamisato, Nishiyatsushiro District, Yamanashi Prefecture, Japan.

Lines
Kajikazawaguchi Station is served by the Minobu Line and is located 66.8 kilometers from the southern terminus of the line at Fuji Station.

Layout
Kajikazawaguchi Station has one island platform connected to the station building by a level crossing. The station is unattended.

Platforms

Adjacent stations

History
It was renamed to its current name on October 1, 1938. The line came under control of the Japanese Government Railways on May 1, 1941 The JGR became the JNR (Japan National Railway) after World War II. Along with the division and privatization of JNR on April 1, 1987, the station came under the control and operation of the Central Japan Railway Company. The station has been unattended since March 2012.

It was used as a filming location for the 2015 movie Our Little Sister.

Surrounding area
 Fuefuki River

See also
 List of railway stations in Japan

External links

   Minobu Line station information 

Railway stations in Japan opened in 1927
Railway stations in Yamanashi Prefecture
Minobu Line
Ichikawamisato, Yamanashi